Gustav Gundelach (19 December 1888 – 8 July 1962) was a German politician of the Communist Party (KPD) and former member of the German Bundestag.

Life 
He was a member of the Hamburg State Parliament for the KPD in the first legislative period after the war. In June 1947 he resigned from the Bürgerschaft as a member of parliament. Gundelach was then a member of the Zone Advisory Council in 1947/48. He was a member of the German Bundestag in the first legislative period (1949-1953).

Literature

References

1888 births
1962 deaths
Members of the Bundestag for Hamburg
Members of the Bundestag 1949–1953
Communist Party of Germany politicians
Members of the Bundestag for the Communist Party of Germany
Members of the Hamburg Parliament
International Lenin School alumni